Crossocheilus nigriloba is a species of ray-finned fish in the genus Crossocheilus. It is native to eastern Borneo.

References

Crossocheilus
Fish described in 1904
Taxa named by Canna Maria Louise Popta